Zorica Pavićević, née Dragović (born 9 May 1956 in Danilovgrad, Montenegro) is a former Yugoslav handball player who competed in the 1984 Summer Olympics.

She was a member of the Yugoslav handball team which won the gold medal. She played four matches and scored two goals.

External links
profile

1956 births
Living people
People from Danilovgrad
Yugoslav female handball players
Montenegrin female handball players
Handball players at the 1984 Summer Olympics
Olympic handball players of Yugoslavia
Olympic gold medalists for Yugoslavia
Olympic medalists in handball
Medalists at the 1984 Summer Olympics